Raipur Sagnewal is a village in Phillaur tehsil of Jalandhar District of Punjab State, India. It is located 2 km away from Nagar, 49 km from Jalandhar and 117 km from state capital Chandigarh. Raipur Sagnewal has postal head office in Phillaur which is 5.6 km away from the village. The village is administrated by a sarpanch who is an elected representative of village as per Panchayati raj (India).

Caste 
The village has schedule caste (SC) constitutes 49.62% of total population of the village and it doesn't have any Schedule Tribe (ST) population.

Education 
The village has a Punjabi medium, Co-educational primary school (PRI Sanghewal). The school provide mid-day meal as per Indian Midday Meal Scheme and the meal prepared in school premises. The school was founded in 1961.

Transport

Rail 
Phillaur Junction is the nearest train station however, Bhatian Railway Station is 11 km away from the village.

Air 
The nearest domestic airport is located 37 km away in Ludhiana and the nearest international airport is located in Chandigarh also Sri Guru Ram Dass Jee International Airport is the second nearest airport which is 143 km away in Amritsar.

References 

Villages in Jalandhar district
Villages in Phillaur tehsil